Jacques Michel Stephan Beeharry (born 19 April 1975) is a Mauritian badminton player and coach. He competed at the 1996 and 2000 Summer Olympics, also at the 1998, 2002, 2006 and 2010 Commonwealth Games. Beeharry was the bronze medalists at the 2003 All-Africa Games in the men's singles, doubles, and team events.

Career overview

Olympic Games 
At the 1996 Summer Olympics, he competed in men's singles event and defeated by Fumihiko Machida of Japan in the first round with the score 15-11, 15-5. In men's doubles event, he was partnered with Eddy Clarisse and defeated by Peter Blackburn and Paul Straight of Australia in the first round with the score 15-3, 15-7. In mixed doubles event, he was partnered with Martine de Souza and defeated by Jens Eriksen and Helene Kirkegaard of Denmark in the first round with the score 15-6, 15-8. At the 2000 Summer Olympics, he competed in mixed doubles event partnered with Marie-Helene Valerie-Pierre and defeated by the Canadian pairs Mike Beres and Kara Solmundson in the first round with the score 15-2, 15-6.

Personal life 
Beeharry is now works as a lecturer of physical education in Collège du Saint-Esprit.

Achievements

All-Africa Games 
Men's singles

Men's doubles

African Championships 
Men's doubles

Mixed doubles

BWF International Challenge/Series 
Men's singles

Men's doubles

Mixed doubles

  BWF International Challenge tournament
  BWF International Series tournament
  BWF Future Series tournament

References

External links
 
 

1975 births
Living people
People from Plaines Wilhems District
Mauritian sports coaches
Badminton coaches
Mauritian male badminton players
Badminton players at the 1996 Summer Olympics
Badminton players at the 2000 Summer Olympics
Olympic badminton players of Mauritius
Badminton players at the 1998 Commonwealth Games
Badminton players at the 2002 Commonwealth Games
Badminton players at the 2006 Commonwealth Games
Badminton players at the 2010 Commonwealth Games
Commonwealth Games competitors for Mauritius
Competitors at the 2003 All-Africa Games
Competitors at the 2007 All-Africa Games
African Games bronze medalists for Mauritius
African Games medalists in badminton
/ref>

Career overview

Olympic Games 
At the 1996 Summer Olympics, he competed in men's singles event and defeated by Fumihiko Machida of Japan in the first round with the score 15-11, 15-5. In men's doubles event, he was partnered with Eddy Clarisse and defeated by Peter Blackburn and Paul Straight of Australia in the first round with the score 15-3, 15-7. In mixed doubles event, he was partnered with Martine de Souza and defeated by Jens Eriksen and Helene Kirkegaard of Denmark in the first round with the score 15-6, 15-8. At the 2000 Summer Olympics, he competed in mixed doubles event partnered with Marie-Helene Valerie-Pierre and defeated by the Canadian pairs Mike Beres and Kara Solmundson in the first round with the score 15-2, 15-6.